Adsbøl is a village in Sønderborg Municipality, South Jutland County, Denmark,
with a population of 333 (1 January 2022).

See also 
 Southern Jutland

References 

Cities and towns in the Region of Southern Denmark
Sønderborg Municipality